Vladimir Miholjević (born 18 January 1974) is a Croatian former professional road bicycle racer. He turned pro in 1997. , he, Robert Kišerlovski  and Kristijan Đurasek are only three Croats who has completed the Tour de France. He competed at the 2008 Summer Olympics.

Major results

1998
 1st  Road race, National Road Championships
 1st  Overall Tour of Croatia
1st Stages 3 & 5
 8th Overall Volta a Portugal
1999
 2nd Time trial, National Road Championships
2000
 National Road Championships
1st  Road race
2nd Time trial
 1st  Overall Jadranska Magistrala
1st Stage 2
 1st Tour du Doubs
 2nd Overall Tour de Slovénie
 7th Overall UNIQA Classic
2001
 1st Poreč Trophy
 National Road Championships
2nd Time trial
3rd Road race
 3rd Overall Tour de Slovénie
 8th Vlaamse Havenpijl
 9th Overall Niedersachsen-Rundfahrt
 9th Veenendaal–Veenendaal
2002
 1st  Mountains classification Paris–Nice
2003
 7th Overall Settimana Internazionale Coppi e Bartali
2004
 3rd Gran Premio di Lugano
 4th Overall Giro della Provincia di Lucca
2005
 5th Gran Premio di Lugano
 7th Giro dell'Emilia
 10th Züri-Metzgete
2007
 1st Stage 1 (TTT) Giro d'Italia
2008
 2nd Road race, National Road Championships
2010
 8th Overall Giro del Trentino
2011
 9th Overall Giro del Trentino
 10th Overall Giro di Sardegna
2012
 National Road Championships
1st  Road race
1st  Time trial

Grand Tour general classification results timeline

References

External links
 
 
 
 
 
 

Living people
1974 births
Croatian male cyclists
Cyclists at the 2008 Summer Olympics
Olympic cyclists of Croatia
Sportspeople from Zagreb